Amanda Anderson is the Andrew W. Mellon Professor of Humanities and English and Director of the Cogut Institute for the Humanities at Brown University. She is a literary scholar and theorist who has written on nineteenth- and twentieth-century literature and culture as well as on contemporary debates in literary and cultural theory.

Career
Anderson received her Ph.D. from Cornell University, specializing in Victorian literature and contemporary literary, cultural, and political theory. Her work on the Victorian period has focused on the relation between forms of modern thought and knowledge (across both literature and the human sciences) and understandings of selfhood, social life, and ethics.

She taught at the University of Illinois from 1989 until 1999 when she joined Johns Hopkins University. She was Caroline Donovan Professor of English Literature from 2002 to 2012 and the head of the English department from 2003 to 2009. Her graduate teaching included courses on forms of argument in contemporary theory; Victorian internationalism; Victorian realism; and ethics and aesthetics in Victorian literature. She taught undergraduate courses on Jane Austen and Charlotte Brontë, nineteenth-century British fiction, and Victorian poetry and nonfiction prose.

She was Director of the School of Criticism and Theory at Cornell University from 2008 until 2014, when she was appointed Honorary Senior Fellow.

In 2012, she became Andrew W. Mellon Professor of Humanities and English at Brown University. In July 2015, she was appointed as the director of the Cogut Center for the Humanities at Brown University. The Center became an Institute in July 2017.

She delivered the Clarendon Lectures at the University of Oxford in November 2015 under the title "Psyche and Ethos".

Awards
2009 Guggenheim Fellowship

Work 
In The Way We Argue Now, Anderson analyzes a number of influential theoretical debates over the past decade or so, with special attention to the forms of argument that shape work in pragmatism, feminism, cosmopolitanism, and proceduralism.

In her 2012 TedxBrownUniversity talk, Anderson reflects on the "distinctive value of the humanities" and argues that the humanities "open one up to an appreciation and an understanding of the centrality of the questions of value to the human experience." After Max Weber, she describes the humanities as engaged in a labor of "clarification": "in assessing works in the humanities, one comes to a better understanding of what one values and how given what one values one can make any number of practical and ethical decisions."

Bibliography
 Tainted Souls and Painted Faces: The Rhetoric of Fallenness in Victorian Culture Cornell University Press, 1993, 
 
 
 
 Amanda Anderson and Harry E. Shaw, eds. A Companion to George Eliot. Wiley-Blackwell, 2013. .
 Bleak Liberalism. Chicago: University of Chicago Press, 2016. .
 Psyche and Ethos: Moral Life After Psychology. Oxford University Press, 2018.

References

Cornell University alumni
Living people
Year of birth missing (living people)
Brown University faculty